The 9th ALMA Awards honors the accomplishments made by Hispanics in film and television in 2006. The awards were held in Pasadena, California, on June 1, 2007, at the Pasadena Civic Auditorium. The show was televised on ABC on June 5, 2007, at 9 p.m. EDT / 8 p.m. CDT. The show was hosted by Desperate Housewives star Eva Longoria. Performances were made by Prince, Los Lonely Boys, Beyoncé, and Calle 13. The awards show is sponsored by the National Council of La Raza.

Winners and nominees
Winners are listed first and highlighted in bold.

Outstanding Motion Picture
Babel
Bobby
Quinceañera

Outstanding Actor - Motion Picture
Jesse Garcia – Quinceañera
Gael García Bernal – Babel
Michael Peña – World Trade Center

Outstanding Actress - Motion Picture
Adriana Barraza – Babel
Cameron Diaz – The Holiday
Eva Mendes – Trust The Man
Emily Rios – Quinceañera

Outstanding Director - Motion Picture
Alejandro González Iñárritu – Babel
Alfonso Cuarón – Children of Men
Emilio Estevez – Bobby
Andy García – The Lost City

Outstanding Screenplay - Motion Picture
Guillermo Arriaga – Babel
Alfonso Cuarón, David Arata, Timothy J. Sexton, Mark Fergus, Hawk Ostby – Children of Men
Emilio Estevez – Bobby

Outstanding Television Series, Mini-Series, or TV Movie
Ugly Betty – ABC
George Lopez – ABC
Walkout – HBO

Outstanding Actor - Television Series, Mini-Series, or TV Movie
(tie) Edward James Olmos – Battlestar Galactica – Syfy
(tie) Michael Peña – Walkout – HBO
Santiago Cabrera – Heroes – NBC
Miguel Ferrer – Crossing Jordan – NBC
Carlos Mencia – Mind of Mencia – Comedy Central

Outstanding Actress - Television Series, Mini-Series, or TV Movie
America Ferrera – Ugly Betty – ABC
Constance Marie – George Lopez – ABC
Sara Ramirez – Grey’s Anatomy – ABC
Alexa Vega – Walkout – HBO

Outstanding Supporting Actor - Television Series, Mini-Series, or TV Movie
Benito Martinez – The Shield – FX
Yancey Arias – Walkout – HBO
Jorge Garcia – Lost – ABC
Mark Indelicato – Ugly Betty – ABC
Tony Plana – Ugly Betty – ABC
Miguel Sandoval – Medium – NBC

Outstanding Supporting Actress - Television Series, Mini-Series, or TV Movie
Ana Ortiz – Ugly Betty – ABC
Tonantzin Esparza – "Walkout" – HBO
Aimee Garcia – George Lopez – ABC
Belita Moreno – George Lopez – ABC
Marisol Nichols – 24 – FOX
Roselyn Sanchez – Without A Trace – CBS
Nadine Velazquez – My Name Is Earl – NBC
Lauren Vélez – Dexter – Showtime

Outstanding Director - Television Series, Mini-Series, or TV Movie
(tie) Edward James Olmos – Walkout – HBO
(tie) Kenny Ortega –High School Musical – Disney Channel
Linda Mendoza – Scrubs – “My Déjà Vu, My Déjà Vu” – NBC

Outstanding Writer - Television Series, Mini-Series, or TV Movie
Silvio Horta – Ugly Betty, “Pilot” – ABC
Marcus De Leon, Ernie Contreras, Timothy J.Sexton – Walkout– HBO
Adam E. Fierro, Charles H. Eglee – The Shield, “Enemy of Good” – FX
Dailyn Rodriguez – Ugly Betty, “After Hours” – ABC

Outstanding Made for TV Documentary
From Mambo to Hip Hop: A South Bronx Tale – PBS
Al Otro Lado (To the Other Side) – PBS
Lalo Guerrero: The Original Chicano – PBS
Pancho Gonzalez: Warrior of the Courts – PBS

References

External links
Official Site

009
Latin American film awards
2007 awards
ALMA
ALMA
ALMA